Aghadowey is a civil and ecclesiastical parish in County Londonderry, Northern Ireland.

Townlands
The parish comprises 66 townlands:

Aghadowey
Ardreagh
Ballinrees
Ballybritain
Ballycaghan
Ballyclough
Ballydevitt
Ballygawley
Ballylintagh
Ballymenagh
Ballynacally More
Ballywillin
Bovagh
Caheny
Carnrallagh
Carranroe
Clagan
Clarehill
Clintagh
Collins
Coolhill
Cornamuclagh
Craiglea Glebe
Craigmore
Crevolea
Crosscanley Glebe
Crossmakeever
Culdrum
Cullycapple
Cullyramer
Dernagross
Droghed
Drumacrow
Drumeil
Drumsteeple
Glenbuck
Glencurb
Glenkeen
Gorran
Gortin Coolhill
Gortin Mayoghill
Keely
Killeague
Killykergan
Kiltest
Knockaduff
Landmore
Lisboy
Lisnamuck
Managher
Mayboy
Mayoghill
Meavemanougher
Meencraig
Menagh
Moneybrannon
Moneycarrie Lower
Mullaghinch 
Mullan
Mullinabrone
Risk
Rusky
Scalty
Seygorry
Shanlongford
Tamlaght

See also
List of civil parishes of County Londonderry
List of townlands in County Londonderry

References

Civil parishes of County Londonderry